Sonia Balu Odedra (born 3 June 1988) is an English cricketer who most recently played for Nottinghamshire and Lightning. She is a right-arm medium-fast bowler and right-handed batter. Her sole match for England was a Test match against India at Wormsley in August 2014.

Early life

Odedra was born on 3 June 1988 in Isleworth, Greater London.

Domestic career

Odedra made her county debut for Leicestershire in 2008, before moving to Nottinghamshire ahead of the 2009 season. Her best county bowling performance of five wickets for 30 runs came against Middlesex on 31 July 2011. She made her county high score of 112 in a County Championship match against Devon on 12 June 2016.

Odedra played for Loughborough Lightning in the Women's Cricket Super League between 2016 and 2018 before joining Western Storm for the 2019 season, where she helped the team to the title and took one wicket in the final against Southern Vipers.

In 2021, Odedra played for Lightning in the women's domestic structure. She was the side's joint-leading wicket-taker in the 2021 Charlotte Edwards Cup, with 6 wickets at an average of 21.00. She was also in the Southern Brave squad for the 2021 season of The Hundred, but did not play a match.

International career

Odedra was called up to the Test and ODI squads to face India in August 2014. She made her England debut in the Test at Wormsley on 10 August, taking one wicket for 50 runs across two innings. She did not play in the subsequent ODI series and has not appeared for England since her sole Test match.

References

External links 
 
 

1988 births
Living people
England women Test cricketers
People from Isleworth
Leicestershire women cricketers
Nottinghamshire women cricketers
Loughborough Lightning cricketers
Western Storm cricketers
The Blaze women's cricketers
British sportspeople of Indian descent
British Asian cricketers